KDE neon is a Linux distribution developed by KDE based on Ubuntu long-term support (LTS) releases, bundled with a set of additional software repositories containing the latest versions of the Plasma 5 desktop environment/framework, Qt 5 toolkit and other compatible KDE software. First announced in June 2016 by Kubuntu founder Jonathan Riddell following his departure from Canonical Ltd., it has been adopted by a steadily growing number of Linux users, regularly appearing in the Top 20 on DistroWatch.com's popularity tables.

It is offered in stable and development variants; the User Edition is a stable release featuring the latest KDE packages that have passed their quality assurance, while the Testing, Unstable, and Developer Edition branches use the latest beta and unstable nightly releases of KDE packages (the last of which bundled with KDE development libraries and headers).

Differences from Kubuntu
Because Kubuntu has the KDE Plasma suite on an Ubuntu base OS, KDE neon often is mistaken for Kubuntu and vice versa. However, the primary difference between the two operating systems is that Kubuntu maintains stable releases and LTS version of Ubuntu while KDE neon focuses on updating developer editions of KDE applications without maintaining stable releases of Ubuntu unless the root user actively chooses to upgrade their systems. KDE neon forces the user to update the distro with PackageKit package instead of Advanced Packaging Tool. This approach prevents possible issues during the KDE packages update.

Hardware
Four laptops have been released with KDE neon pre-installed: KDE Slimbook (released in March 2017), KDE Slimbook II (2018), KDE Slimbook III (2020) and KDE Slimbook IV (2022).

History and versions
KDE neon first started taking shape in late 2015 as a way to provide a rolling release of KDE software on top of Ubuntu's stable OS base. Daily installation images began being built in January of 2016. These images were based on Ubuntu 15.10, but in April of 2016, upgrades to Ubuntu 16.04, which would eventually become the base for the first general release, which happened on 8 June 2016.

KDE neon announced in January 2017 that the distribution will be switching its installer from Ubiquity to Calamares due to Ubiquity "not having some features". In February 2018, KDE neon developers removed the LTS Editions from the downloads page, but kept these editions in the download mirrors because of "lots of people asking which edition to use and what the difference is." In May 2018, KDE started changing KDE neon from being based on Ubuntu 16.04 to Ubuntu 18.04. KDE neon preview images, based on Ubuntu 18.04, became available in August 2018. On 10 August 2020, KDE released a rebased version of KDE Neon, based on Ubuntu 20.04.

As KDE neon is primarily a packaging of KDE software (and occasionally updated dependencies) on top of Ubuntu LTS, its versions are simply numbered off the Plasma release version. However, some notable versions of KDE neon User Edition are listed below to show technical progression.

Fresh installation images are built regularly, grabbing the latest packages from Ubuntu and the latest packages from the KDE neon repositories.

See also
 Graphical user interface
 Long-term support
 Kubuntu

References

External links

KDE
Ubuntu derivatives
X86-64 Linux distributions
Linux distributions
KDE Plasma
KDE software
KDE Platform
Debian-based distributions
Linux
Rolling Release Linux distributions
